The Command-Aire 3C3 and similar 4C3 and 5C3 are American three-seat open cockpit utility, training and touring biplanes developed by Command-Aire in the late 1920s and early 1930s.

Design and development

The Command-Aire did not at first appear to offer much of an advancement over the vast multitude of three seat biplanes built around the ubiquitous Curtiss OX-5 engine to similar designs, with similar dimensions and construction methods, many of which were already in production. Indeed, the OX-5 era was coming to an end. The vast quantities of war-surplus engines, which had swamped the market in the immediate post-war period, were running low. Only by the smaller details can it be distinguished from its brethren. The basic design was by Morton Cronk, and although it had excellent high altitude capabilities, it was slow. This setback nearly foundered the company before its first aircraft entered production.

The design's proportions were good, but Cronk's departure left the company without an engineer. It happened to be that Albert Vollmecke, a Heinkel engineer was in the US attempting to find a customer to build Heinkel HD 40 mailplanes under licence for the US market. Seeing that there was little prospect of any sales in the US, he decided to hire on with an American company, and Command-Aire lucked out. His first task was to rework the design to provide documentation for the new approval process. While there was only one major visible external difference, he undertook an extensive redesign based on his experience in the much more scientifically-grounded German aviation industry, and to bring the design into line with CAA (now FAA) certification requirements, which involved a lot of submissions, and alterations, and resubmissions before they signed off on it. Many parts had to be redesigned when it was easier to redo the design, than to use the existing design to calculate the necessary strength margins. The most obvious change was a switch from four small conventional ailerons at the tips to two slotted nearly full-span ailerons on the lower wing. This improved low speed control dramatically, allowing lateral control even after the aircraft had stalled - a novelty among American aircraft at the time, and a recurring advertising theme. The second change was the incorporation of a Phylax fire suppression system capable of putting almost any fire out in flight. The third novelty was the use of a rotisserie type fuselage jig, that ensured accuracy and consistency between the airframes they built, reducing the chance of building an airplane that couldn't be rigged to fly right. Although Command-Aire's advertising claims that Vollmecke invented this, he claimed he merely brought the idea from Europe.

Airframe details

The fuselage was built in a rotating jig that ensured accuracy from welded chromium-molybdenum alloy steel tubes, faired with wooden battens. The top of the fuselage was covered in large metal panels that could be readily opened to provide access, and a compartment for luggage was provided between the cockpits large enough for a suitcase.

The slightly staggered wings were built around solid spruce spars, with spruce and plywood warren truss type ribs. The wings were braced with cables.

The ailerons and the entire empennage were also built from chromium-molybdenum alloy steel tubing, and all controls were actuated through pushrods and bellcranks, with no cables or pulleys used. The ailerons on the prototype were conventional, however on production variants, they extended across nearly the full span on the lower wings only, and had a slot that allowed air to flow over the aileron at low airspeeds and high angles of attack, which helped ensure lateral control even after the wings had stalled. These were not Frise-type ailerons though, but conventional ailerons with a slot at the hinge line.

The undercarriage was a split axle type, braced to a steel tube four point pyramid that extended from the belly of the aircraft, with suspension provided with bungee cords which were protected by leather boots. Both cabane and interplane struts took the form of an N and were steel tubing as well. The 3C3 can be distinguished from later types by having an additional strut providing lateral bracing from the forward strut anchor point on the wing, to the lower longeron at the firewall, triangulating the structure. The 4C3 and later types dispensed with this extra strut, and coincided with an extensive redesign that otherwise had few external differences.

While normally a three seat design, those aircraft with a T in the designation were built as two-seat trainers specifically for flight instruction, and a crop dusting version was also sold, with the space in the front cockpit being filled with a large hopper, and the fuel tank relocated to the wing center section. At least 17 of these were built, with others converted from other variants.

The BS-14 and BS-16 (BS standing for Biplane sport) were the final developments, and again featured extensive redesign work, but once again with few visible external alterations. The rudder was redesigned, and a new and promising engine was added to the lineup - the Lycoming R-680. On the BS-16, the undercarriage was changed to the outrigger type and a tailwheel was provided in lieu of the skid used previously, while the rear seat was raised to improve visibility.

Engines

A variety of engines were installed during the life of the design, with the area ahead of the firewall being redesigned to accommodate lighter engines, with longer noses to maintain the correct balance.

The problematic engine supply situation was well understood long before the last Curtiss OX-5 was installed in an airplane, and substantial efforts for alternatives were made. Simplicity and reliability were key, and the solutions invariably involved air-cooled radial engines, however the designs were not sufficiently developed, and there were many failures, and for various reasons. As a German, it was natural for Vollmecke to look to Germany, where some of the best designs were available, however two major problems surfaced. The first was that the supply of these engines was endangered by economic instability in Germany. The second was that the Command-Aire people were never able to get their engines to run right on the fuel available. Vollmecke suspected that the octane rating was too low, which caused knocking - potentially damaging the engine. Only 7 aircraft were built with the German radials. The Czechoslovakian Walter NZ-120 was even less successful, and only one was used. The most successful of the replacement engines with Command-Aire, was the Curtiss Challenger, despite its poor reputation elsewhere. Over 50 aircraft were fitted with this engine. Had the company continued in existence, then the Wright J6 and Lycoming R-680 that were only installed in a small number of airframes, would probably have eventually outsold the OX-5 as they did with other aircraft types.

Operational history

As a publicity stunt in 1928, the Command-Aire test pilot, Wright "Ike" Vermilya II demonstrated the 3C3's stability and ability to fly "hands off", by leaving the cockpit while in flight and riding the fuselage of the aircraft like one would ride a horse, without a parachute. He turned the aircraft by leaning in the desired direction.

In 1929, the government decided to allow aerobatics (known as stunting at the time), during the Annual Arkansas Air Tour being held in 1929 and so a team of three Warner-powered Command-Aire 3C3-As were formed as "The Blue Devils", but painted incongruously in black and orange stripes.

A Challenger powered-Command-Aire 5C3 was entered into the Guggenheim Safe Aircraft Competition in 1929. Although the freakish Curtiss Tanager and Handley Page Gugnunc were the only ones to pass all the qualifying rounds, the 3C3 was the last aircraft not specially designed for the contest to be eliminated, and unlike those types would actually enter revenue service. It later succeeded on a repeat of the test that it was eliminated on.

In 1929, Command-Aire contracted the Curtiss Flying Service to handle sales, through their large number of facilities, and Curtiss purchased a large number of aircraft for flight training for their own schools.
Recognizing that the excessive number of aircraft companies in the aviation industry would force consolidation into a smaller number of larger companies, it had long been the intention to merge Command-Aire into a larger company even before the onset of the Great Depression forced matters. Negotiations had been underway for just such a merger - into Curtiss, at one time the largest aircraft manufacturer in the United States, however while negotiations were still underway, Curtiss's financial problems forced it to merge with Wright Aeronautical. Unfortunately, Wright had themselves recently absorbed Travel Air, whose offerings included the Travel Air 2000 which was similar to the Command-Aire biplanes. Negotiations collapsed, and along with them, went the contracts for supplying the flying schools - and access to the sales network.

Command-Aire landed a by now much needed contract from the Chilean government to produce 36 3C3-BTs to be built at a specially-built facility in Chile, however no Command-Aires seem to have been either used in that country, either civil or military.

Only one example appears to have been exported, a 3C3 that went to Canada in 1931, where it went through a succession of private owners as CF-APQ, having previously been NC5590 in the US.

Variants

(data from Eckland, www.aerofiles.com)
3C3 (ATC 53, 2-201)1928  Curtiss OX-5, 116 built.
3C3-A (ATC 118)1929   Warner Scarab, 20 built. 1 fitted with Edo floats.
3C3-AT (ATC 151)1929 2 seat trainer developed from 3C3-A, about 6 built.
3C3-B (ATC 120, 2-440)1929  Siemens-Halske Sh 12, 5 built, 1st possibly modified from 3C3 with a new c/n.
3C3-BT (ATC 209)1929  Siemens-Halske Sh 14 2 seat trainer developed from 3C3-B. 2 built plus 1 converted from 3C3-B.
3C3-T (ATC 150)1929  Curtiss OX-5, 30 built.

4C3 1929  Walter NZ-120 1 built

5C3 (ATC 184)1929   Curtiss Challenger, 35 built.
5C3-A (ATC 185)1929  Hisso-Wright E, 3 built.
5C3-B (ATC 214)1929  Axelson A, 4 built, One might be conversion of 3C3-A.
5C3-C (ATC 233)1929   Wright J-6, 5 built, Some converted to cropdusters with front cockpit faired over
Cotton Duster1930  Curtiss Challenger-powered 5C3 cropduster, 17 built.

BS-14 (ATC 2-204)1930   Warner Scarab, 2 seat Biplane Sport aerobatic trainer, 1 built.
BS-161930  Lycoming R-680, 2 seat aerobatic trainer, 1 built.

Surviving aircraft/Aircraft on display

 
Ten examples have active registrations, but not all may be airworthy.

3C3
3C3 N7885 msn 530 Plainville, Georgia
3C3 N136E msn 532 is at the Yanks Air Museum in Chino, California
3C3 N476E msn 586 Hialeah, Florida
3C3-T N583E msn 607 is at the Western Antique Aeroplane & Automobile Museum in Hood River, Oregon
3C3-B N610E msn W-69 Snellville, Georgia
3C3-AT N970E msn W-108, was on display at the Western North Carolina Air Museum and the Wings and Wheels Museum in Orlando, Florida, now under private ownership and restoration in Westfield, MA.

5C3
5C3 N939E msn W-93 Rockton, Illinois
5C3 N946E msn W-95 Sitka, Alaska
5C3 N996E msn W-135 Lakeland, Florida
5C3 N997E msn W-136 Lancaster, Kansas

Specifications (Command-Aire C3C (OX-5))

See also

1928 in aviation

Aircraft of comparable role, configuration and era 
(Partial listing, only covers most numerous types)

Alexander Eaglerock
American Eagle A-101
Brunner-Winkle Bird
Buhl-Verville CA-3 Airster
Butler Blackhawk
Parks P-1
Pitcairn Mailwing
Spartan C3
Stearman C2 and C3
Swallow New Swallow
Travel Air 2000 and 4000
Waco 10

Related lists 

 List of aircraft
 List of civil aircraft

External links
Video of OX-5-powered Command-Aire 3C3-T N583E from the Western Antique Aeroplane & Automobile Museum in flight

References

Notes

Citations

Bibliography

Biplanes
1928 in aviation
Aircraft first flown in 1928
Aircraft manufactured in the United States
United States civil aircraft
Single-engined tractor aircraft
Civil utility aircraft
1920s United States civil aircraft